Caenopedina pulchella is a species of sea urchins of the family Pedinidae. Their armour is covered with spines. Caenopedina pulchella was first scientifically described in 1907 by Alexander Emanuel Agassiz and Hubert Lyman Clark.

References

Animals described in 1907
Pedinoida